Tillandsia balbisiana, common name northern needleleaf, is a species of bromeliad in the genus Tillandsia. This species in native to Mexico, Central America, Colombia, Venezuela, the West Indies, and Florida.

Cultivars 
 Tillandsia 'Dura Flor'
 Tillandsia 'Florida'
 Tillandsia 'Polly Ellen'
 Tillandsia 'Red Fountain'
 Tillandsia 'Royale'
 Tillandsia 'Timm'

References

External links
US Department of Agriculture plants profile
Wild Florida Photo, photography by Paul Rebmann

balbisiana
Flora of Florida
Flora of Mexico
Flora of Central America
Flora of Colombia
Flora of Venezuela
Flora of the Caribbean
Plants described in 1830
Epiphytes
Flora without expected TNC conservation status